SS Australasian, was built in 1884 by Robert Napier & Co of Govan, Glasgow for George Thompson & Son (Aberdeen Line).

Australasian took part of the New South Wales Contingent to serve in Sudan with British forces as part of the Suakin Expedition, arriving at the Red Sea port of Suakin on 29 March 1885. In 1906 the Ottoman Government bought her and renamed her Scham. She was beached near Constantinople to prevent from sinking. Salvaged in 1918 she was reduced to a coal hulk. She was scrapped at Savona, Italy in 1955.

Notes

References

Further reading

1884 ships
Ships built in Govan
Steamships of the United Kingdom
Maritime incidents in 1915